Jacques Osmont (born 20 March 1954) is a former French racing cyclist. He rode in the 1980 and 1981 Tour de France.

References

External links
 

1954 births
Living people
French male cyclists
Sportspeople from Orne
Cyclists from Normandy